Mitsujirō Ishii (1889-1981) was a Japanese politician who served as Deputy Prime Minister of Japan and Commerce and Industry Minister. In 1946, he became a representative in the National Diet, representing the Third District of Shizuoka prefecture.

Personal life 
He was born in August 1889 and died in September 1981.

References 

Deputy Prime Ministers of Japan
1889 births
1981 deaths